Stradella (Lombard: Stradéla) is a town and comune (population 10,922) of the Oltrepò Pavese in the Province of Pavia in the northern Italian region of Lombardy. It is situated in the Padan Plain, about 5 km (3 mi) south of the river Po.

History
Stradella, together with what is now the almost disinhabited locality of Montalino, was under the suzerainty of the bishop of Pavia in the early Middle Ages (being the most important center of the fief in the 11th century). Montalino and Pavia were repeatedly ravaged in the course of the Wars of the Guelphs and Ghibellines, particularly in 1373 by John Hawkwood's troops.

The bishop's seigniory ended in 1797 with the abolition of feudalism. It obtained the status of town in 1865. Stradella received the honorary title of city with a royal decree on May 25, 1865.

Musical tradition

The city was once an important centre for the production of accordions and still hosts a museum dedicated to this instrument.  was the first accordion builder in Stradella, his business was continued by his sons and further descendants. Later famous names include the brothers Crosio Fratelli.

Personalities
Stradella was the birthplace of Agostino Depretis.

Sport 
Football: 
 Stradellina, Promozione, group G
 Oratorio Stradella, Terza Categoria, group C

Basketball:
 Pallacanestro Stradella, Promozione

References

External links

Cities and towns in Lombardy